Diri (Diryawa) is an Afro-Asiatic language spoken in Bauchi State, Nigeria.

Notes 

West Chadic languages